23S rRNA (guanine2535-N1)-methyltransferase (AviRa) is an enzyme with systematic name S-adenosyl-L-methionine:23S rRNA (guanine2535-N1)-methyltransferase. This enzyme catalyses the following chemical reaction

 S-adenosyl-L-methionine + guanine2535 in 23S rRNA  S-adenosyl-L-homocysteine + N1-methylguanine2535 in 23S rRNA

This is one of the methyltransferases from Streptomyces viridochromogenes . Streptomyces viridochromogenes produces the antibiotic avilamycin A which binds to the 50S ribosomal subunit to inhibit protein synthesis.

References

External links 
 

EC 2.1.1